Prunus × arnoldiana is a hybrid species of Prunus discovered growing on the grounds of the Arnold Arboretum of Harvard University. It is a cross of flowering plum, Prunus triloba, and cherry plum, Prunus cerasifera. One of its parents was initially thought to be Prunus tomentosa. It differs from P. triloba in a number of features, the most important being having more copious white flowers. P. triloba flowers are usually pink. Likewise, it differs from P. cerasifera in a number of features, the most important being its more compact, shrubby growth form.

References

arnoldiana
Hybrid prunus
Plants described in 1920
Interspecific plant hybrids